Lizandro Adrián Echeverría Pacheco (born 17 February 1991) is a Mexican professional footballer who plays as a forward.

Honours
Individual
Liga de Expansión MX Golden Boot (Shared): Guardianes 2020

External links

1991 births
Living people
Mexican footballers
Association football forwards
C.F. Mérida footballers
Pioneros de Cancún footballers
Inter Playa del Carmen players
Atlético Reynosa footballers
Atlante F.C. footballers
Cafetaleros de Chiapas footballers
Ascenso MX players
Liga Premier de México players
Tercera División de México players
Footballers from Quintana Roo